Nicola Ficano (born 21 February 1987) is an Italian footballer defender/midfielder. He played professionally with hometown club Palermo.

Career
A product of Palermo's youth system, he made his debut for the club playing as starter in the 2006–2007 Coppa Italia (against Sampdoria) and UEFA Cup (against Fenerbahçe).

He was sold in a co-ownership bid to Sambenedettese, together with fellow player Davis Curiale, during the summer of 2007, after he refused an offer from Mezzocorona. He was then loaned out to Martina on 31 January 2008.

In June 2008 Sambenedettese bought the remaining half of his registration rights from Palermo. He spent the second half of the season on loan to Lega Pro Seconda Divisione club Colligiana, and was subsequently released after Sambenedettese was excluded from Italian football due to financial troubles.

In November 2009, he joined Carrarese for a trial period, but he was not eventually offered a contract.

He successively left professional football for good, joining Eccellenza Sicily amateurs Parmonval (based in the Palermo neighbourhood of Partanna-Mondello) in 2010. Ficano was announced in August 2011 as a new acquisition from Eccellenza Sicily amateurs Palermitana, thus effectively ending his professional career at the age of 24. He then joined another team from same division, Audace Monreale (based in Monreale), later in December 2011.

References

External links
Ficano's profile (from US Palermo official website)

1987 births
Living people
Italian footballers
Palermo F.C. players
Footballers from Palermo
A.S. Sambenedettese players
A.S.D. Olimpia Colligiana players
A.S.D. Martina Calcio 1947 players
Association football midfielders